Britain's Brightest Family is a British quiz show broadcast by ITV that aired from 10 January 2018 to 20 May 2021 and presented by Anne Hegerty.

Format
The family - a young captain, and two older relatives - answer questions on the buzzers. Unlike most other shows, this quiz isn't straightforward trivia, but uses pictures and graphics throughout.

The show opens and closes with a team round. One player buzzes in, and nominates another member of their team to answer the question. To show this, the nominated player's chair goes a little way up.

Buoyed by a decent reception, a second series was commissioned. There were some changes in the format and set design. Quick-fire questions on the buzzers still came first and last. There is now only one head-to-head round, and it's questions about a single random topic.

A multiple choice round involved all six players tapping answers to the same questions. There was a memory round. The final quick-fire round was timed, rather than for five questions, and still played for double points.

Winners

Regular series

Celebrity series

Transmissions

Regular series

Celebrity series

References

External links

2018 British television series debuts
2021 British television series endings
2010s British game shows
2020s British game shows
English-language television shows
ITV game shows
Television series by ITV Studios